Unified Communist Party of Italy (in Italian: Partito Comunista Unificato d'Italia) is a political party in Italy. The party upheld the Three Worlds Theory and retained contacts with the Chinese Communist Party following the death of Mao Zedong. The party vehemently opposed the Soviet Union and the Italian Communist Party. It was led by Osvaldo Pesce. The party published the journal Linea proletaria ('Proletarian Line').

History

Organization of Marxist-Leninist Communists of Italy
The group emerged from the Organization of Marxist-Leninist Communists of Italy, which was formed in 1970 after a split in the Communist Party of Italy (Marxist-Leninist) (PCd'I(m-l)) following the expulsion of the PCd'I(m-l) party hierarchy second-in-command Osvaldo Pesce. Osvaldo Pesce was the general secretary of the group. The organization began issuing the journal Linea proletaria ('Proletarian Line'). Whilst the main Italian fraternal party of the Communist Party of China was the -led PCd'I(m-l), the CPC maintained relations with the Organization of Marxist-Leninist Communists of Italy as well.

Shifts in China
The Pesce group praised the new Chinese leadership following the death of Mao Zedong and the purge of the Gang of Four, earning Pesce an invitation to be received by Ji Dengkui in Beijing on behalf the CPC politburo in February 1977.

Unity congress

At a congress held in Rome May 6–8, 1977, the Organization of Marxist-Leninist Communists of Italy merged with smaller groups (according to Peking Review, they were 'Struggle of Long Duration, Consciousness of the Workers and Proletarian Ideology') into the Unified Communist Party of Italy (PCUd'I). During the founding congress, Pesce attacked the Soviet Union and the Italian Communist Party, referring to Soviet leader Leonid Brezhnev as the 'new Hitler' and called Enrico Berlinguer and Luciano Lama 'the greatest reactionaries in Italy'. Pesce retained the post of general secretary of the PCUd'I. Other Central Committee members included Burgani, Losurdo and Nappini.

Later developments
PCUd'I held its third party congress in Florence in July 1978, which reaffirmed the adherence of the party to Marxism-Leninism Mao Zedong Thought.

PCUd'I joined the Communist Coordination.

References

Communist parties in Italy
Political parties established in 1970